John Ogilvy may refer to:

John Ogilvy, spy of William Cecil, 2nd Earl of Exeter and James VI
 Sir John Ogilvy, 9th Baronet, MP for Dundee

See also
John Ogilvy-Grant, 7th Earl of Seafield, Scottish nobleman
John Ogilvie (disambiguation)